The Eisner Award for Best Publication for Early Readers is an award for "creative achievement" in American comic books for early readers.

Name change

From 2012 to 2015 the award was appended with "(up to age 7)" and from 2016 to 2019 it was appended with "(up to age 8)". For the 2020 awards the age designation was dropped.

Winners and nominees

References

External links
 Eisner Award on the comic-con web page

Lists of books
Children's literary awards
Publication for Early Readers